The 1992 IAAF Grand Prix Final was the eighth edition of the season-ending competition for the IAAF Grand Prix track and field circuit, organised by the International Association of Athletics Federations. It was held on 4 September at the Stadio Olimpico di Torino in Turin, Italy. Kevin Young (400 metres hurdles) and Heike Drechsler (long jump) were the overall points winners of the tournament. A total of 17 athletics events were contested, nine for men and eight for women.

The host stadium was not of a suitable size to safely host the men's hammer throw event, so this was instead contested separately in Brussels at the annual Memorial Van Damme meeting.

Medal summary

Men

Women

Points leaders

Men

Women

References
IAAF Grand Prix Final. GBR Athletics. Retrieved on 2015-01-17.

External links
IAAF Grand Prix Final archive from IAAF

Grand Prix Final
Grand Prix Final
International athletics competitions hosted by Italy
Sports competitions in Turin
1990s in Turin
IAAF Grand Prix Final
September 1992 sports events in Europe